Billbergia elegans is a plant species in the genus Billbergia. This species is native to Brazil.

Cultivars 
 Billbergia 'Caraca'
 Billbergia 'Esther'
 Billbergia 'George Cooley'
 × Cryptbergia 'Hazel Quilhot'

References 

BSI Cultivar Registry Retrieved 11 October 2009

elegans
Endemic flora of Brazil
Flora of the Atlantic Forest
Flora of Espírito Santo
Flora of Minas Gerais